The 1897 Nova Scotia general election was held from 13 April to 20 April 1897 to elect members of the 32nd House of Assembly of the Province of Nova Scotia, Canada. It was won by the Liberal party.

Results

Results by party

Retiring incumbents
Liberal
Richard Hunt, Queens
Daniel H. MacKinnon, Guysborough
Joseph Matheson, Richmond
Firman McClure, Colchester
Allan Moreash, Lunenburg
William Roche, Halifax

Liberal-Conservative
William Anderson Black, Halifax
Alexander Grant, Pictou

Nominated candidates
1897 Nova Scotia Provincial Election

Legend
bold denotes party leader
† denotes an incumbent who is not running for re-election or was defeated in nomination contest

Valley

|-
| rowspan="2"|Annapolis
||
|James Wilberforce Longley1,87126.38%	
|
|Thomas R. Jones1,68023.69%	
|
|
||
|James Wilberforce Longley
|-
||
|Joseph A. Bancroft1,87826.48%
|
|C. S. Harrington1,66423.46%	
|
|
||
|Joseph A. Bancroft
|-
| rowspan="2"|Digby
||
|Angus Morrison Gidney1,49831.14%
|
|Frank E. Comeau94019.54%	
|
|
||
|Angus Morrison Gidney
|-
||
|Ambroise-Hilaire Comeau1,51231.43%	
|
|M.R. Timpany86017.88%	
|
|
||
|Ambroise-Hilaire Comeau
|-
| rowspan="2"|Hants
|
|William McDonald Douglas1,70724.35%
||
|Charles Smith Wilcox1,74624.91%	
|
|
||
|Charles Smith Wilcox
|-	
||
|Arthur Drysdale1,83926.24%
|
|James A. Thompson1,71724.50%	
|
|
||
|Arthur Drysdale
|-
| rowspan="2"|Kings
||
|Brenton Dodge2,35433.08%	
|
|Peter Innis1,46020.52%	
|
|
||
|Brenton Dodge
|-
||
|Harry H. Wickwire2,19530.85%	
|
|Leander Rand1,10715.56%	
|
|
||
|Harry H. Wickwire
|-
|}

South Shore

|-
| rowspan="2"|Lunenburg
||
|John Drew Sperry2,58125.52%	
|
|A.J. Wolff2,51224.84%	
|
|
||
|Allan Moreash†
|-
||
|Charles Edward Church2,51424.86%	
|
|Emanuel Hebb2,50724.78%	
|
|
||
|Charles Edward Church
|-
| rowspan="4"|Queens
||
|Edward Matthew Farrell87626.38%	
|rowspan=2|
|rowspan=2|John Hutt66620.05%	
|rowspan=2|
|rowspan=2|
|rowspan=2 |
|rowspan=2|Edward Matthew Farrell
|-
|
|R. R. McLeod1845.54%
|-
||
|Thomas Keillor71221.44%	
|rowspan=2|
|rowspan=2|T. H. Siddell1795.39%	
|rowspan=2|
|rowspan=2|
|rowspan=2 |
|rowspan=2|Richard Hunt†
|-
|
|John Millard70421.20%
|-
| rowspan="2"|Shelburne
||
|Thomas JohnstonAcclaimed	
|
|
|
|
||
|Thomas Robertson
|-
||
|Thomas RobertsonAcclaimed	
|
|	
|
|
||
|Thomas Johnston
|-
| rowspan="2"|Yarmouth
||
|William Law1,50129.14%	
|
|Joseph R. Wyman95818.60%	
|
|E. C. Simonson (Prohibitionist-Temperance)60511.74%
||
|William Law
|-
||
|Henry S. LeBlanc1,47328.60%	
|
|Albert A. Pothier61411.92%
|
|
||
|Albert A. Pothier
|-
|}

Fundy-Northeast

|-
| rowspan="2"|Colchester
|
|Alfred Dickie2,24024.22%
||
|Thomas McMullen2,36325.55%	
|
|
||
|Firman McClure†
|-	
||
|Frederick Andrew Laurence2,35825.50%
|
|Wilbert David Dimock2,28624.72%	
|
|
||
|Frederick Andrew Laurence
|-
| rowspan="2"|Cumberland
||
|Thomas Reuben Black3,48729.14%	
|
|A.A. McKinnon2,68922.47%	
|
|
||
|Thomas Reuben Black
|-
||
|Alexander E. Fraser3,25127.16%	
|
|J. C. McDougall2,54121.23%	
|
|
||
|Alexander E. Fraser
|-
|}

Halifax

|-
| rowspan="3"|Halifax
||
|William Bernard Wallace5,10117.36%	
|
|Miner T. Foster4,75416.18%	
|
|
||
|William Bernard Wallace
|-
||
|David McPherson5,30718.06%	
|
|John Fitzwilliam Stairs4,56315.53%	
|
|
||
|William Roche†
|-
||
|George Mitchell5,31218.07%
|
|T. W. Walsh4,35014.80%	
|
|
||
|William Anderson Black†
|-
|}

Central Nova

|-
| rowspan="2"|Antigonish
||
|Angus McGillivray1,26327.77%	
|
|Charles B. Whidden1,12324.69%	
|
|
||
|Angus McGillivray
|-	
||
|Christopher P. Chisholm1,17625.86%
|
|Hugh MacDonald98621.68%	
|
|
||
|Christopher P. Chisholm
|-
| rowspan="2"|Guysborough
||
|William Akins Fergusson1,52529.90%	
|
|C. Ernest Gregory1,06520.88%	
|
|
||
|Daniel H. MacKinnon†
|-
||
|John Howard Sinclair1,52329.86%	
|
|Charles S. Elliott98719.35%	
|
|
||
|John Howard Sinclair
|-
| rowspan="3"|Pictou
||
|James Drummond McGregor3,45617.24%
|
|William Cameron3,26216.28%	
|
|
||
|William Cameron
|-
||
|Edward Mortimer Macdonald3,42217.07%	
|
|Charles Elliott Tanner3,28916.41%	
|
|
||
|Charles Elliott Tanner
|-	
|
|John McIntosh3,29916.46%	
||
|Matthew Henry Fitzpatrick3,31416.54%
|
|
||
|Alexander Grant†
|-
|}

Cape Breton

|-
| rowspan="2"|Cape Breton
||
|Arthur Samuel Kendall3,70529.35%	
|
|William MacKay2,66921.14%
|
|
||
|William MacKay
|-
||
|Alexander Johnston3,55928.19%	
|
|John McCormick2,69121.32%	
|
|
||
|John McCormick
|-
| rowspan="2"|Inverness
||
|James MacDonald2,64632.94%	
|
|John H. Jameison1,53719.13%	
|
|
||
|John H. Jameison
|-
||
|Moses J. Doucet2,50131.13%	
|
|Alexander Campbell1,35016.80%	
|
|
||
|Alexander Campbell
|-
| rowspan="2"|Richmond
||
|Simon Joyce95825.86%	
|
|John Morrison91024.57%	
|
|
||
|Simon Joyce
|-
||
|Duncan Finlayson1,03427.92%	
|
|Remi Benoit80221.65%	
|
|
||
|Joseph Matheson†
|-
| rowspan="2"|Victoria
||
|George Henry Murray1,27336.59%	
|
|John A. McDonald65118.71%	
|
|
||
|George Henry Murray
|-
||
|John Gillis Morrison1,09331.42%	
|
|A. G. McLeod46213.28%	
|
|
||
|John Gillis Morrison
|-
|}

References

1897
1897 elections in Canada
1897 in Nova Scotia
April 1897 events